The Expert Witness Institute is a UK legal institute for expert witnesses founded  by Lord Woolf, Michael Davies (judge) and other legal experts including Sir Robin Jacob and Roger V Clements. It was incorporated as a non-profit making company in 1997.

The Institute developed views on the Ambush defence in 1994 Joint Conference entitled "Beyond reasonable doubt" organised with the Royal Society of Medicine.

References

Legal organisations based in England and Wales
Evidence law